Catty Cornered is a 1953 Warner Bros. Merrie Melodies cartoon directed by Friz Freleng. The short was released on October 31, 1953, and stars Tweety and Sylvester. It features a forerunner of the Rocky and Mugsy duo.

Plot
Tweety, who is a rare and valuable bird, has been captured and held for ransom by a duo of criminals: Rocky and his assistant Nick. Sylvester, who is interested only in finding food to eat, makes a number of attempts to steal Tweety:
Sylvester climbs up the fire escape, then edges along a ledge to the apartment. Rocky sees him and places a banana peel on the ledge, causing Sylvester to slip and fall off.
Sylvester climbs up the main stairs. Tweety escapes and meets Sylvester on the landing. Tweety refuses Sylvester's offer to use his mouth as a hiding place (the cat tried to eat him; "Not so hard!"). Sylvester instead hides Tweety under a can just as the criminals arrive. Nick takes Sylvester inside for searching, while Rocky removes Tweety from under the can and replaces the bird with a firecracker. Sylvester escapes with the can, unaware of the firecracker, and is injured when it explodes.
Sylvester hoists himself up using a pulley on a building site. He grabs Tweety and escapes, but the steel plate on the end of the pulley falls back down and lands on him.

Sylvester then gains access using a dumbwaiter. At the same time, police surround the building. Nick hides Tweety in the dumbwaiter, unaware that Sylvester is in there. Rocky is arrested (and likely Nick too). Sylvester escapes from the apartment block with Tweety and is quickly hailed as a hero by the press, who are unaware that he was only interested in eating the bird. Sylvester is forced to attend a celebration in which the mayor requests Sylvester to kiss Tweety, but he eats him, only to get forced to spit Tweety out by the mayor. Tweety ended the cartoon with "Oooh, he's a bad putty tat".

Note: One of the broadcast stations at the celebration was KFWB.

Cast
 Mel Blanc as Tweety, Sylvester, Rocky, Nick, Paperboy, News Reporter, Police Officer, Photographer and Mayor.
 Ralph James as Narrator.

Clip reusage
Part of this cartoon was edited into Friz Freleng's Looney Looney Looney Bugs Bunny Movie. With new animation with Bugs Bunny giving Sylvester a badge.

References

External links

Merrie Melodies short films
Warner Bros. Cartoons animated short films
1953 animated films
Short films directed by Friz Freleng
1953 short films
Animated films about cats
Animated films about birds
Films scored by Carl Stalling
1950s Warner Bros. animated short films
Tweety films
Sylvester the Cat films
1950s English-language films
American animated short films
Rocky and Mugsy films